Bogumiłki  is a village in the administrative district of Gmina Bobrowo, within Brodnica County, Kuyavian-Pomeranian Voivodeship, in north-central Poland.

Population 56.

References

Villages in Brodnica County